John David Drummond, 8th Earl of Perth,  (13 May 1907 – 25 November 2002), styled Viscount Strathallan from 1937 to 1951, was a Scottish peer, banker and politician.  Because of the complicated history of the earldom of Perth (attainder 1715, reversed 1853), he was sometimes deemed informally to be the 17th Earl of Perth.

He was Minister of State for Colonial Affairs from 1957 to 1962.

Background and education
Drummond was the son of Eric Drummond, 7th Earl of Perth, and the Hon. Angela Mary Constable-Maxwell, a daughter of Marmaduke Constable-Maxwell, 11th Lord Herries of Terregles.

A Roman Catholic, he was educated at Downside School and Trinity College, Cambridge. As his parents travelled for his father's work, David Drummond spent much of his childhood with his maternal aunt, the Duchess of Norfolk.

Career
After beginning a banking career, during the Second World War the young Drummond went to Paris to help Noël Coward in a propaganda office, then returned to London to work in the War Cabinet office and later at the Ministry of Production, having been recruited by Anthony Eden. In 1945, after the war, he joined Schroders and was a partner until 1956.

On his father's death in December 1951, he succeeded him as Earl of Perth and was a Representative peer for Scotland from 1952 to 1963. In 1957, despite not being a member of the Conservative party, was appointed Minister of State for Colonial Affairs in Harold Macmillan's government, a post he held until 1962. He was appointed a Privy Counsellor in 1957. Perth was also First Crown Estate Commissioner from 1962 to 1977, Chairman of the Ditchley Foundation from 1963 to 1966 and Chairman of the Reviewing Committee on the Export of Works of Art from 1972 to 1976.

He was a champion of Scottish arts and heritage, serving as a trustee of the National Museums of Scotland and the National Library of Scotland, and a fellow of the Society of Antiquaries.

Personal life
In 1934 Perth married Nancy Fincke, an American, in New York City. They lived at Stobhall, near Stanley in Tayside and had two sons. Lady Perth died in 1996, and Lord Perth in November 2002, aged 95. He was succeeded by his elder son, John Eric Drummond, 9th Earl of Perth, who is also the titular 15th Duke of Perth and 14th Viscount Strathallan in the unrecognized Jacobite peerage. He is sometimes deemed to be the 18th Earl of Perth, 12th Lord Drummond of Cromlix, 14th Lord Maderty and 22nd Lord Drummond.

The present Earl of Perth was educated at Downside School and graduated from Trinity College, Cambridge, with a B.A. degree and from Harvard University with an M.B.A. degree. On 7 January 1963 he married Margaret Anne Gordon, daughter of Robin Gordon. They had three children before divorcing in 1972.

Annabella Margaret Drummond (b. 18 Jun 1964, d. 21 Jun 1964)
James David Drummond, Viscount Strathallan (b. 24 Oct 1965)
Hon. Robert Eric Drummond (b. 7 May 1967)

He married secondly in 1988 Mrs. Marion Verity Grey Elliot, née Eton.

References

Obituary:The Earl of Perth, Daily Telegraph, 29 November 2002

External links

1907 births
2002 deaths
Alumni of Trinity College, Cambridge
Anglo-Scots
British Roman Catholics
David Drummond, 17th Earl of Perth
Dukes of Perth
Earls of Perth
Members of the Privy Council of the United Kingdom
Ministers in the Macmillan and Douglas-Home governments, 1957–1964
People educated at Downside School
Schroders people
Scottish representative peers
Fellows of the Society of Antiquaries of Scotland
20th-century antiquarians
Perth